Senator Page may refer to:

Alfred R. Page (1859–1931), New York State Senate
Carroll S. Page (1843–1925), U.S. Senator from Vermont
Charles H. Page (1843–1912), Rhode Island State Senate
George E. Page (1873–1959), Wisconsin State Senate
John Page (New Hampshire politician) (1787–1865), U.S. Senator for New Hampshire
Roy M. Page (1890–1958), New York State Senate
Vivian L. Page (1894–1962), Virginia State Senate

See also
Alonzo C. Paige (1797–1868), New York State Senate